10th Online Film Critics Society Awards
January 8, 2007

Best Picture: 
 United 93 
The 10th Online Film Critics Society Awards, honoring the best in film for 2006, were given on 8 January 2007.

Winners and nominees

Best Picture
United 93
Babel
Children of Men
The Departed
Pan's Labyrinth

Best Director
Martin Scorsese – The Departed
Alfonso Cuarón – Children of Men
Guillermo del Toro – Pan's Labyrinth
Alejandro González Iñárritu – Babel
Paul Greengrass – United 93

Best Actor
Forest Whitaker – The Last King of Scotland
Sacha Baron Cohen – Borat
Leonardo DiCaprio – The Departed
Ryan Gosling – Half Nelson
Peter O'Toole – Venus

Best Actress
Helen Mirren – The Queen
Penélope Cruz – Volver
Judi Dench – Notes on a Scandal
Meryl Streep – The Devil Wears Prada
Kate Winslet – Little Children

Best Supporting Actor
Jackie Earle Haley – Little Children
Alan Arkin – Little Miss Sunshine
Eddie Murphy – Dreamgirls
Jack Nicholson – The Departed
Mark Wahlberg – The Departed

Best Supporting Actress
Abigail Breslin – Little Miss Sunshine
Adriana Barraza – Babel
Cate Blanchett – Notes on a Scandal
Jennifer Hudson – Dreamgirls
Rinko Kikuchi – Babel

Best Original Screenplay
Pan's Labyrinth – Guillermo del ToroBabel – Guillermo Arriaga
Little Miss Sunshine – Michael Arndt
The Queen – Peter Morgan
United 93 – Paul Greengrass

Best Adapted ScreenplayChildren of Men – David Arata, Alfonso Cuarón, Mark Fergus, Hawk Ostby and Timothy J. SextonThe Departed – William Monahan
Little Children – Todd Field and Tom Perrotta
The Prestige – Jonathan Nolan and Christopher Nolan
Thank You for Smoking – Jason Reitman

Best Foreign Language FilmPan's Labyrinth
The Death of Mr. Lazarescu
L'Enfant
Volver
Water

Best Documentary
An Inconvenient Truth
Dave Chappelle's Block Party
Jesus Camp
Neil Young: Heart of Gold
Shut Up & Sing

Best Animated Feature
A Scanner Darkly
Cars
Happy Feet
Monster House
Over the Hedge

Best Cinematography
Children of Men – Emmanuel LubezkiApocalypto – Dean Semler
Babel – Rodrigo Prieto
The Fountain – Matthew Libatique
Pan's Labyrinth – Guillermo Navarro

Best EditingUnited 93 – Clare Douglas, Richard Pearson and Christopher RouseBabel – Douglas Crise and Stephen Mirrione
Children of Men – Alfonso Cuarón and Alex Rodríguez
The Departed – Thelma Schoonmaker
The Fountain –  Jay Rabinowitz

Best Original ScoreThe Fountain – Clint MansellBabel – Gustavo Santaolalla
The Illusionist – Philip Glass
Notes on a Scandal – Philip Glass
Pan's Labyrinth – Javier Navarrete

Breakthrough FilmmakerJonathan Dayton and Valerie Faris – Little Miss Sunshine
Ryan Fleck – Half Nelson
Rian Johnson – Brick
Neil Marshall – The Descent
Jason Reitman – Thank You for Smoking

Breakthrough Performer
Sacha Baron Cohen – Borat
Shareeka Epps – Half Nelson
Jennifer Hudson – Dreamgirls
Rinko Kikuchi – Babel
Elliot Page – Hard Candy

Notes

References

2006
2006 film awards